Aymen Soltani, born 1 December 1987 in Dahmani, is a Tunisian footballer who plays as a striker for Club Africain.

References

Tunisian footballers
Club Africain players
Étoile Sportive du Sahel players
1987 births
Living people
Dahmani AC players
ES Hammam-Sousse players
Olympique Béja players
AS Kasserine players
People from Dahmani
Association football forwards